Pristava pri Višnji Gori is a small settlement in the hills south of Višnja Gora in the Municipality of Ivančna Gorica in central Slovenia. The area is part of the historical region of Lower Carniola. The municipality is now included in the Central Slovenia Statistical Region.

Name
The name of the settlement was changed from Pristava to Pristava pri Višnji Gori in 1953. In the past the German name was Maierhof.

References

External links

Pristava pri Višnji Gori on Geopedia

 Populated places in the Municipality of Ivančna Gorica